Naustathmus or Naustathmos may refer to:
Naustathmus (Cyrenaica), a town of ancient Cyrenaica, now in Libya
Naustathmus (Pontus), a town of ancient Pontus, now in Turkey